Alfred Trübner Nutt (22 November 1856 – 21 May 1910) was a British publisher who studied and wrote about folklore and Celtic studies.

Biography
Nutt was born in London, the eldest son of publisher David Nutt. His mother was the granddaughter of another well-known publisher, William Miller. He was educated at the University College London School, University College London and at College de Vitry-le-François, in Vitry-le-François, northeast France. He spent three years serving a business apprenticeship in Leipzig, Berlin, and Paris, before taking over his late father's business in 1878. Nutt founded The Folk-Lore Journal (now Folklore). He was elected president of the Folklore Society in 1897.

Nutt was a friend and supporter of Jessie Weston, sharing her interest in Celtic origins of the Grail legend, and publishing some of her books. He was also associated with Whitley Stokes, Eleanor Hull and Kuno Meyer and his work had a substantial influence on the scholarship of Roger Sherman Loomis. He was also instrumental to the establishment of the Irish Texts Society and his firm published the early volumes of Society from 1899 to 1914.

Nutt produced numerous works of scholarship in his own right, including Studies on the legend of the holy grail, with special reference to the hypothesis of its Celtic origin and his collaboration with Meyer on The Voyage of Bran, Son of Febal, to the Land of the Living. He wrote studies of the Mabinogion and was working on an annotated edition of Matthew Arnold's Study of Celtic Literature at the time of his death.

Nutt drowned in the Seine on 21 May 1910 while attempting to rescue his invalid 17-year-old son who had been dragged into the river when his horse bolted. His wife M. L. Nutt succeeded him as head of the firm.

Further reading
 Wood, J., "Folklore studies at the Celtic dawn: the rôle of Alfred Nutt as publisher and scholar", in Folklore 110, 1999, pp. 3–12.

References

External links

 
 
Alfred Nutt at Findarticles.com
 "In Memoriam: Alfred T. Nutt", obituary by Edward Clodd, Folk-Lore Volume 21, 1910
 

1856 births
1910 deaths
Publishers (people) from London
English folklorists
British male writers
Arthurian scholars
Presidents of the Folklore Society
19th-century English businesspeople
Male non-fiction writers